Le Blanc-Mesnil is a station on the line B of the Réseau Express Régional, a hybrid suburban commuter and rapid transit line. It is named after the village of Blanc-Mesnil where the station is located.

References

External links

 

Railway stations in France opened in 1980
Railway stations in Seine-Saint-Denis
Réseau Express Régional stations